Acatlán is a municipality and village located in the central zone of the state of Veracruz, Mexico, about 35 km from state capital Xalapa. The municipality has an area of 20.56 km².

Geographic Limits

The municipality of Acatlán  is delimited to the east by the Tepetlán, to the south by the Naolinco, to the west by the Miahuatlán, and to the north by Chiconquiaco. It is watered by the rivers Actopan and Pájaro Verde.

References

External links 
  Municipal Official Site
  Municipal Official Information

Municipalities of Veracruz